Preston Richard is a civil parish in South Lakeland, Cumbria, England. It includes the village of Endmoor, and the hamlets of Crooklands, Birkrigg Park, Milton, Low Park, and Summerlands.

In the 2001 census the parish had a population of 1,307, decreasing slightly at the 2011 census to 1,305.

There are 16 grade II listed buildings in the parish, including several milestones, bridges and a privy.

In 1870-1872 it was described as "a township in Heversham parish" with a population of 504 and a gunpowder works.

See also

Listed buildings in Preston Richard

References

Further reading

External links
 Cumbria County History Trust: Preston Richard (nb: provisional research only – see Talk page)

 Includes maps and historic photos

Civil parishes in Cumbria
South Lakeland District